Chaumont-le-Bois is a commune in the Côte-d'Or department in eastern France.

Geography

Chaumont-le-Bois covers 7.5 km2 between 216 and 393 meters above sea level. Located at an average altitude of 228 meters, the Fontainotte brook is the main watercourse of the village.

History

Antiquity
With the neighboring village of Obtrée, Chaumont-le-Bois is a stopover on the ancient road coming from Mont Lassois heading northeast.

Middle Ages
From the 14th century, the village lives almost exclusively from the vine. It is believed that the settlement was located at the height of the valley on the site of the present cemetery. The seigniory seems essentially secular; of the old castle, only one dovecote remains.

Modern Times
On the eve of the Revolution when the population was around 500 inhabitants, the present church destroyed at the end of the 17th century is rebuilt below.

In 1811, Napoleon's land registry records 170 hectares of vines in the commune. After the phylloxera crisis that affected the region in the last decade of the 19th century, these were uprooted. Vine cultivation only resumed in 1987.

Economy
The economy of Chaumont-le-Bois is linked to the exploitation of the forest (sawmill) and the culture of the vine (Pinot noir and Chardonnay) for the Crémant du Châtillonnais production (vineyard in AOC Crémant de Bourgogne).

Tourism 
"Floral village": participation in the bloom competition of towns and villages. Current award: 2 flowers. 
Chaumont-le-Bois is a stopover on the route du Crémant, there is a vineyard and it's winemaker's museum .
Path of the Picherelle.
The Fontainotte park where you can find some games for the children and picnic places. There is also a short path along the Fontainotte stream.

Administration
The first mayor was elected in 1793, this table shows only the mayors from 1945 onwards.

Coat of arms

An azure background with three golden oak leaves.

Population

Local Culture & Heritage

Sites and Monuments
St. Martin's Church built in 1787.
Little castle of the lords of Chaumont-le-Bois and its dovecote near the Fontainotte stream.

Personalities
 Godelieve Rosselle to whom Willem Vermandere (Belgian singer) dedicated his song: La belle Rosselle (sung in Flemish).

See also
Communes of the Côte-d'Or department

References

Bibliography

Communes of Côte-d'Or